Mohammed Ameen Haidar (born April 29, 1980) is a Saudi Arabian former footballer who played as a midfielder. who is the assistant coach of the Saudi Arabia national team He was a member of the Al Ittihad team that won the 2005 AFC Champions League and the 2006 FIFA World Cup with Saudi Arabia.

Honours

Club
Al Ittihad
AFC Champions League: 2005

International
Saudi Arabia
Islamic Solidarity Games: 2005

References

1980 births
Saudi Arabian footballers
Saudi Arabia international footballers
Living people
2006 FIFA World Cup players
Ittihad FC players
Sportspeople from Jeddah
Al-Qadsiah FC players
Al-Hazem F.C. players
Association football midfielders
Saudi Professional League players